Representing Greenwich which was then in Kent, the original Greenwich Cricket Club took part in known matches  between 1730 and 1767. According to surviving records the team used an unknown location on nearby Blackheath for its home matches. Greenwich teams are recorded, either individually or jointly with other clubs, in four known matches.

References

Cricket in Kent
English club cricket teams
English cricket teams in the 18th century
Former senior cricket clubs
Sports clubs established in the 1700s